Dmitri Sergeyevich Aliev (born 1 June 1999) is a Russian figure skater. He is the 2020 European champion and the 2020 Russian national champion. On the junior level, he is the 2017 World Junior silver medalist, the 2016–17 Junior Grand Prix Final champion, a two-time medalist at the 2016 Youth Olympics (bronze in the men's singles discipline and gold in the team event), and a two-time (2016, 2017) Russian national junior champion.

Personal life
Dmitri Sergeyevich Aliev was born on 1 June 1999 in Ukhta, Komi Republic, Russia. On his paternal side, Dmitry has Azerbaijani roots. His father, Sergey Vasilevich, is the director of a children's and youth sports school №1 in Ukhta. His mother, Elena, is a skier. In September 2022, Aliev received a summons to appear at the military commissariat for a potential call-up to serve in the Russian Army during the 2022 Russian mobilization.

Career
Having begun skating in 2005, Aliev trained in Ukhta until 2013 when he moved to Saint Petersburg, becoming a student of Evgeni Rukavicin.

2014–15 season
Aliev debuted on the ISU Junior Grand Prix (JGP) series in the 2014–15 season. Awarded bronze medals in Ljubljana, Slovenia and Aichi, Japan, he finished as the third alternate for a place at the JGP Final. Making his senior international debut, he placed tenth at the 2014 Golden Spin of Zagreb, an ISU Challenger Series event. Returning to the junior ranks, he won bronze medals at the 2015 Russian Junior Championships and 2015 European Youth Olympic Winter Festival.

2015–16 season
In 2015–16, Aliev's first assignment was a Junior Grand Prix event in Riga, Latvia. Placing sixth in the short program and first in the free skate, he won the gold medal by a margin of 5.32 points ahead of Latvia's Deniss Vasiļjevs. He then took gold in Linz, Austria, with a total score 14 points higher than silver medalist Vincent Zhou, and qualified for the Junior Grand Prix Final.

Competing on the senior level, Aliev was awarded bronze at the 2015 International Cup of Nice and silver at the 2015 CS Tallinn Trophy. In December, he won the silver medal at the 2015–16 JGP Final in Barcelona, having finished second to Nathan Chen of the United States. Later that month, he placed sixth at the 2016 Russian Championships in Yekaterinburg before winning his first junior national title in January in Chelyabinsk.

Aliev won the bronze medal in the men's singles discipline and the gold medal in the team event at the 2016 Youth Olympics in Hamar, Norway. He was awarded a small gold medal for his short program result at the 2016 World Junior Championships in Debrecen, Hungary. Ranked seventh in the free skate, he finished 6th overall.

2016–17 season
Starting his season on the Junior Grand Prix series, Aliev won gold in Ostrava, Czech Republic, after placing first in both segments. Ranked first in the short and seventh in the free, he finished fourth at his next JGP event in Ljubljana, Slovenia. His results gave him the last spot at the 2016–17 JGP Final in Marseilles. In December, he won the gold medal in France by a margin of 3.55 points over Alexander Samarin. Later that month, Aliev finished fifth at the 2017 Russian Championships in Chelyabinsk.

In early 2017 Aliev won his second junior national title in Saint Petersburg. This result gave him a spot at the 2017 World Junior Championships. He ranked first in the short program, third in the free skate, and second overall in Taipei, Taiwan, winning the silver medal behind American Vincent Zhou and ahead of the teammate Alexander Samarin.

2017–18 season
Aliev started his season by placing 1st in the short program at the domestic competition in Saint Petersburg. He landed 4Lz-3T combination, 4T, 3A and scored 99.7 points. He decided to try six quads in two programs, including quad Lutz, quad Salchow and two quad toe loops in the free program.

Aliev was going to compete at the 2017 CS Ondrej Nepela Trophy but withdrew due to ankle inflammation.

In October 2017, Aliev debuted at the Grand Prix series. He placed sixth at the 2017 Rostelecom Cup and eighth at the 2017 NHK Trophy. He then won his first ISU Challenger Series gold medal at the 2017 CS Tallinn Trophy.

He was third in the 2018 Russian Nationals. In January 2018, he won the silver medal at the 2018 European Championship after placing second in both the short program and the free skate. At the Europeans, he scored his personal best score of 274.06 points.

In February 2018, Aliev finished seventh at the 2018 Winter Olympics and in March 2018, he also placed seventh at the 2018 World Championships.

2018–19 season
Aliev started his season at the 2018 CS Lombardia Trophy. Placing third in the short program and second in the free skate, he placed second overall, earning the silver medal. He then competed at the 2018 CS Finlandia Trophy, where he finished fifth. In his Grand Prix events, he placed fifth at 2018 NHK Trophy and fourth at 2018 Internationaux de France.  Competing at the 2019 Russian Championships, Aliev had a disastrous short program, falling on an underrotated quad toe loop and completely missing the takeoff on his planned triple Axel.  He rose to fifth place overall after placing fourth in the free skate.

Aliev later competed at the Russian Cup Final, hoping to qualify for the Russian World Championships team, but placed ninth.

2019–20 season
Beginning on the Challenger series, Aliev won the silver medal at the 2019 CS Lombardia Trophy and then won the 2019 CS Ondrej Nepela Memorial.  At his first Grand Prix event, 2019 Skate America, Aliev placed second in the short program, behind Nathan Chen and fractions of a point ahead of Keegan Messing.  Errors in the free skate dropped him to third place overall. The bronze medal was his first on the Grand Prix.  At the 2019 Rostelecom Cup, Aliev placed second in the short program.  He was second in the free skate as well, barely back of the lead, and missed taking the gold medal due to repeating too many jumps and getting his final triple Lutz invalidated for violating the Zayak rule.  Aliev's results qualified him for the Grand Prix Final for the first time.  After issues with his combination, he placed fourth in the short program, managing only a double jump instead of a triple in the second half.  In the free skate, he finished last and dropped to last place overall after falling on several jumps and spins.

Aliev placed fourth in the short program at the 2020 Russian Championships, performing only a triple Lutz instead of his planned quad and putting a hand down on an underrotated triple Axel.  Second in the free skate despite two falls, one on a quad toe loop and the other during his step sequence, Aliev captured his first Russian national title.

At the European Championships, Aliev placed second in the short program with 88.45 points, despite under rotations on two of his jumps.  In the free skate, Aliev underrotated and put a foot down on his opening quad Lutz, but skating the rest of the program cleanly to finish first in the free skate with a new personal best of 184.44 — over 15 points more than his prior personal best. With a total overall score of 272.89 points, he became Russia's first European men's champion since Evgeni Plushenko in 2012.  

Aliev was assigned to compete at the 2020 World Championships in Montreal, but these were cancelled as a result of the coronavirus pandemic.

2020–21 season 
Aliev missed the senior Russian test skates as he was receiving treatment for a back injury in Germany. Competing on the domestic Cup of Russia series, he won the bronze medal at the third stage in Sochi.

With the pandemic continuing to affect international travel, the ISU opted to run the Grand Prix based primarily on geographic location. Aliev was assigned to the 2020 Rostelecom Cup, where he placed fifth in the short program after making several errors. He was fifth in the free skate and overall.

On December 3, it was announced that Aliev had to withdraw from the fifth stage of the Russian Cup because he had contracted COVID-19. He did not participate in the 2021 Russian Championships.

Aliev was chosen for the 2021 Channel One Trophy, a televised team event organized in lieu of the cancelled European Championships.  He was selected for the Red Machine team captained by Alina Zagitova.  Aliev placed fourth in the short program and fifth in the free skate, and the Red Machine team took the trophy.  Subsequently, Aliev participated in the Russian Cup Final, which was widely assumed to be the deciding event for the second Russian men's berth at the 2021 World Championships in Stockholm.  Aliev placed ninth in the short program after popping his triple Axel to a single and making a quad error.  He rose to third place overall with a first-place finish in the free skate.

2021–22 season 
Aliev made his season debut at the 2021 CS Finlandia Trophy, where he won the bronze medal. The next week he competed at the 2021 Budapest Trophy, finishing in the silver medal position. His first Grand Prix assignment was initially the 2021 Cup of China, but following its cancellation he was reassigned to the 2021 Gran Premio d'Italia in Turin. He placed ninth at the event. He was fifth at the 2021 Internationaux de France. 

At the 2022 Russian Championships, Aliev finished in ninth place.

Records and achievements
 Set the former junior-level men's record for the combined total to 240.07 points at the 2016–17 JGP Final. The record was broken by Vincent Zhou at the 2017 Junior Worlds.
 The first European skater to have completed three different quad jumps in international competitions: toe loop, Lutz and Salchow.

Skating technique

Aliev practiced different quadruple jumps, such as 4T, 4S, 4Lo, 4F and 4Lz.

In practice, he has also demonstrated difficult sequences, such as 3A-3A and 4T-3T-3T-1Lo-3S-2A.

Programs

Competitive highlights 

GP: Grand Prix; CS: Challenger Series; JGP: Junior Grand Prix

Detailed results

Senior level

Small medals for short and free programs awarded only at ISU Championships.

Junior level

Small medals for short and free programs awarded only at ISU Championships. At team events, medals awarded for team results only.

References

External links 

 
 

1999 births
Russian male single skaters
European Figure Skating Championships medalists
World Junior Figure Skating Championships medalists
Living people
People from Ukhta
Figure skaters at the 2016 Winter Youth Olympics
Figure skaters at the 2018 Winter Olympics
Olympic figure skaters of Russia
Youth Olympic gold medalists for Russia
Sportspeople from the Komi Republic